The 1976 Utah State Aggies football team was an American football team that represented Utah State University as an independent during the 1976 NCAA Division I football season. In their first season under head coach Bruce Snyder, the Aggies compiled a 3–8 record and were outscored by opponents by a total of 263 to 170.

Schedule

References

Utah State
Utah State Aggies football seasons
Utah State Aggies football